Ryōsei, Ryosei or Ryousei (written: 遼生, 亮正 or 良生) is a masculine Japanese given name. Notable people with the name include:

, Japanese politician
Ryosei Kobayashi (born 1994), Japanese squash player
, Japanese actor and voice actor
, Japanese politician

Japanese masculine given names